Jerome Young (born August 14, 1976) is an American former track and field sprinter who specialized in the 400-meter dash. He won gold medals with the United States 4 × 400-meter relay team at the 2001 World Championships in Athletics and 1997 World Championships in Athletics, but was later stripped of these medals due to doping and was ultimately banned from the sport. He also was the heats runner for the relay team at the 2000 Summer Olympics, where the Americans won gold, but this medal was rescinded as well.

Background
Born in Clarendon, Jamaica, he attended A.I. Prince Technical High School in Hartford, Connecticut. In 1995, as a senior in high school, Jerome set a Connecticut state record of 45.01 in the 400 m.  He was Track and Field News "High School Athlete of the Year" in 1995.

Jerome was part of the world record breaking 4 × 400 m relay team in 1998 along with Michael Johnson, Antonio Pettigrew, and Tyree Washington.

On June 29, 2004 the IAAF announced that Young committed a doping offense on 26 June 1999.

The effect of the decision was to negate all his results from 26 June 1999 to 25 June 2001, and to ban him permanently from the date of the decision. Accordingly, he and his teammates were stripped of their 2000 Olympic medal in the 4x400 m relay.

The Court of Arbitration for Sport reinstated the 2000 Olympic gold for Jerome's relay teammates in 2005. Jerome had not run in the final; he had only run in one of the qualifying heats.

Young and the U.S. team had previously been stripped of the 2003 world championship relay gold due to a doping admission by teammate Calvin Harrison.

On August 2, 2008, the International Olympic Committee stripped the gold medal from the U.S. men's 4x400-meter relay team, due to a doping admission by teammate Antonio Pettigrew.

Jerome Young resides in Raleigh, NC as a sprinting coach at Millbrook High School. Jerome also teaches special education at high school.

International competitions
These were later stripped due to Young's drug use during his career.

1997
World Championships – Athens, Greece.
4 x 400 m. relay gold medal
1998
IAAF World Cup – Johannesburg, South Africa.
400 m. silver medal
2001
World Championships – Edmonton, Alberta, Canada.
4 x 400 m. gold medal
World Indoor Championships – Lisbon, Portugal.
4 x 400 m. silver medal

See also
Doping at the Olympic Games
Doping at the World Championships in Athletics
List of doping cases in sport
List of stripped Olympic medals
List of World Championships in Athletics medalists (men)
Men's 4 × 400 metres relay world record progression
United States at the World Athletics Championships

References

External links
Background: Jerome Young case from USA Today

1976 births
Living people
People from Clarendon Parish, Jamaica
Track and field athletes from Connecticut
American male sprinters
African-American male track and field athletes
Olympic track and field athletes of the United States
Athletes (track and field) at the 2000 Summer Olympics
Competitors stripped of Summer Olympics medals
Goodwill Games medalists in athletics
World Athletics Championships athletes for the United States
Athletes stripped of World Athletics Championships medals
American sportspeople in doping cases
Jamaican sportspeople in doping cases
Doping cases in athletics
Jamaican emigrants to the United States
Competitors at the 1998 Goodwill Games
21st-century African-American sportspeople
20th-century African-American sportspeople